Night's Yawning Peal: A Ghostly Company is an anthology of supernatural short stories edited by American writer August Derleth. It was released in 1952 by Arkham House with Pellegrini & Cudahy in an edition of 4,500 copies. The cover price on the first edition is $3.00. It is the second and last book that Arkham published with Pellegrini and Cudahy.

An abridged paperback omitting several stories was published by Signet in 1974 as Night's Yawning Peal

Contents

Night's Yawning Peal: A Ghostly Company contains the following tales:

 "Foreword"
 "Mr. George" by Stephen Grendon
 "The Loved Dead" by C. M. Eddy, Jr.
 "The Sign" by Lord Dunsany
 "The La Prello Paper" by Carl Jacobi
 "The Gorge of the Churels" by H. Russell Wakefield
 "Dhoh" by Manly Wade Wellman
 "The Churchyard Yew" by J. Sheridan LeFanu
 "Technical Slip" by John Beynon Harris
 "The Man Who Collected Poe" by Robert Bloch
 "Hector" by Michael West
 "Roman Remains" by Algernon Blackwood
 "A Damsel With a Dulcimer" by Malcolm Ferguson
 "The Suppressed Edition" by Richard Curle
 "The Lonesome Place" by August Derleth
 "The Case of Charles Dexter Ward" by H. P. Lovecraft

Sources

1952 anthologies
Fantasy anthologies
Horror anthologies
Arkham House books